James Taylor Fleeting (born 8 April 1955) is a Scottish football player and manager, who is currently acting as assistant manager at Kilwinning Rangers .

Fleeting began his professional career with Norwich City, making only one appearance before joining Ayr United, where he stayed for six years. He went on to play for Clyde and Greenock Morton (where he was assistant manager to Willie McLean), before joining Clyde again. He was appointed manager of Stirling Albion in the summer of 1988, before leaving the club and joining Kilmarnock as manager from 1989 to 1992.

Fleeting has since worked as the director of football development for the Scottish Football Association, training coaches at the National Sports Centre in Largs. José Mourinho and André Villas-Boas both obtained UEFA qualifications at Largs.

Fleeting is the father of former Scotland women's national football team player Julie Fleeting. In 1998 he served as the women's national team coach, prior to the appointment of Vera Pauw.

References

External links
 

1955 births
Ayr United F.C. players
Clyde F.C. players
Association football defenders
Greenock Morton F.C. players
Greenock Morton F.C. non-playing staff
Kilmarnock F.C. managers
Living people
Norwich City F.C. players
Scottish Football League players
Scottish football managers
Scottish footballers
Stirling Albion F.C. managers
English Football League players
Tampa Bay Rowdies (1975–1993) players
North American Soccer League (1968–1984) players
Scottish Football League managers
Scottish expatriate sportspeople in the United States
Expatriate soccer players in the United States
Scottish expatriate footballers
Scotland women's national football team managers